Blackbeard the Pirate is a 1952 Technicolor adventure film directed by Raoul Walsh and starring Robert Newton, Linda Darnell, William Bendix, Keith Andes, and Torin Thatcher. The film was made by RKO Radio Pictures and produced by Edmund Grainger from a screenplay by Alan Le May based on the story by DeVallon Scott.

Plot

The film follows British Navy Lieutenant Robert Maynard (Keith Andes), who sets out to earn a reward by proving that privateer Henry Morgan (Torin Thatcher) also engages in piracy.

Maynard poses as a surgeon on board the ship of pirate Charles Bellamy, who he believes is in league with Morgan. Once Maynard and fellow spy Briggs come on board, they discover that the pirate Blackbeard (Robert Newton) has murdered Bellamy and taken over as captain.

Also on board is Edwina Mansfield, a pirate's daughter, who was going to marry Bellamy. Blackbeard knows that Morgan loves Mansfield and will pursue her.

Blackbeard orders Maynard to remove a bullet from his neck, and demands sailor Gilly watch him. Gilly slips Maynard a note begging him to slit the pirate's throat, but Maynard declines.

Maynard slips into the Blackbeard's quarters and finds Bellamy's logbook, which he hopes will contain evidence that Bellamy gave Morgan stolen goods.

Maynard then defends Edwina against the unwanted advances of a lecherous pirate, killing him with his dagger. She tells Maynard that she agreed to marry Bellamy to escape from Morgan, from whom she has stolen treasure, which is now hidden in a clothes chest.

Blackbeard breaks open one of Edwina's chests but discovers only letters in which Edwina implicates Morgan as Bellamy's ally. Maynard tries to steal the letter, but Blackbeard stops him, noting that if Morgan were arrested, all of his loot would go to the King.

Blackbeard finally identifies the treasure chest and claims it.

Cast
 Robert Newton as Captain Edward Teach
 Linda Darnell as Edwina Mansfield
 William Bendix as Ben Worley
 Keith Andes as Robert Maynard
 Torin Thatcher as Sir Henry Morgan
 Irene Ryan as Alvina, a lady in waiting
 Alan Mowbray as Noll
 Richard Egan as Briggs
 Skelton Knaggs as Gilly
 Dick Wessel as Dutchman
 Anthony Caruso as Pierre La Garde
 Jack Lambert as Tom Whetstone
 Noel Drayton as Jeremy
 Pat Flaherty as Job Maggot

Production
The film was based on an original story by DeVallon Scott. It was on the schedule at RKO for 16 months before being taken over by producer Edmund Grainger for his independent unit. It originally conceived as a vehicle for Faith Domergue. It was going to be filmed under the title Buccaneer Empire by director Robert Stevenson. Several months later RKO announced the lead would be played by Robert Newton, who had just enjoyed success playing Long John Silver in Treasure Island (1950). Production took a while to begin; for a time it seemed Newton might be replaced by Charles Laughton. Alan Le May was hired to rewrite the script shortly before filming began on 15 May 1952.

References

External links

 
 
 
 

1952 films
1950s historical adventure films
American historical adventure films
1950s English-language films
Pirate films
Films directed by Raoul Walsh
Films scored by Victor Young
RKO Pictures films
Cultural depictions of Blackbeard
Cultural depictions of Henry Morgan
1950s American films
Films set in the 1710s